Celia Kritharioti is a Greek fashion designer. She is the owner of the oldest Greek fashion house, established in 1906.

Personal life
Kritharioti is married to Greek shipowner Nikolas Tsakos and has three children, two of which are models in her company. She graduated from Pierce - The American College of Greece

Career
Kritharioti is pinpointed in UK Vanity Fair as one of six couturiers to watch worldwide: "Beautifully feminine and embellished concoctions from this couturier to the stars", noted Annabel Davison, Senior Editor at Vanity Fair on Jewellery and Couture. Supporters include Jennifer Lopez, Lady Gaga, Paula Patton, Kim Kardashian, Kelly Rutherford, Miranda Lambert, Samantha Barks, Maria Menounos, Giuliana Rancic, Gemma Arterton. Gwyneth Paltrow was photographed for Vogue Mexico in Celia Kritharioti Haute Couture.

Natalia Vodianova, Naomi Campbell, Iman, Gisele Bündchen, Laetitia Casta, Claudia Schiffer, Elle Macpherson and Karolina Kurková are top models who have worked with her. She was appointed to design the “Olympic Air personnel costumes”. Kritharioti designed the costumes of "Romeo & Juliet" and "Swan Lake" ballets for the Greeκ National Opera presented at the Megaron venue in Athens.

Kritharioti presents an Haute Couture Collection (annually), a Bridal Collection (annually), the 5226 Prêt-à-Porter collection (twice a year) and the 5226 Princess Collection for children (twice a year). She also designs sunglasses, jewelry and accessories.

References

Sources 
 
 
 
 
 

Greek fashion designers
Greek women fashion designers
Year of birth missing (living people)
Living people
People from Athens